Euphagus is a small genus of American blackbirds. It contains two extant species: Brewer's blackbird, Euphagus cyanocephalus, and rusty blackbird E. carolinus.

The living species are very similar medium-sized birds. Adult males have mainly black plumage and a bright yellow eye; females are dark gray-brown.

Extant species

A prehistoric relative, the large-billed blackbird (Euphagus magnirostris), is known from Late Pleistocene fossils found in the famous tar seeps of Rancho La Brea, California, as well as the Talara Tar Seeps of northwestern Peru and the Mene de Inciarte Tar Seep of Venezuela. It may have been a close associate of Pleistocene megafauna communities and went extinct following the collapse of the megafauna populations.

Description 
Both are migratory, wintering in the southern United States and Mexico, although some Brewer's blackbirds are present all year in the western US.

They build cup nests, and the female alone incubates the eggs. They are gregarious outside the breeding season.

Both species feed on seeds and insects, the rusty having a particularly high insect component to its diet. The fortunes of the two species are contrasting, with Brewer's expanding east in the Great Lakes region, while rusty shows a worrying decline in numbers.

References 

Jaramillo, Alvaro & Burke, Peter (1999): New World Blackbirds. Christopher Helm, London. 

 
Bird genera

Taxa named by John Cassin